The 2011 UCI Para-cycling Track World Championships were the World Championships for track cycling where athletes with a physical disability competed in 2011. The Championships took place at the Montichiari Velodrome in Montichiari, Italy from 11 to 13 March 2011.

Classification

Sport class
Cycling
C1 - locomotor disability: Neurological, or amputation
C2 - locomotor disability: Neurological, decrease in muscle strength, or amputation
C3 - locomotor disability: Neurological, or amputation
C4 - locomotor disability: Neurological, or amputation
C5 - locomotor disability: Neurological, or amputation
Tandem
Tandem B - visual impairment

Medal summary

Medal table

Participating nations
27 nations participated.

References

UCI Paracycling Track World Championships, Union Cycliste Internationale (UCI)
Official event website of the 2011 UCI Para-cycling Track World Championships

External links
Official event website
Results book

 
UCI Para-cycling Track World Championships
International cycle races hosted by Italy